Texas Pioneers is a 1932 American Western film written and directed by Harry L. Fraser. The film stars Bill Cody, Andy Shuford, LeRoy Mason, Sheila Bromley, John Elliott and Harry Allen. The film was released on June 18, 1932, by Monogram Pictures.

Cast           
Bill Cody as Captain Bill Clyde
Andy Shuford as Andy Thomas
LeRoy Mason as Mark Collins 
Sheila Bromley as Nancy Thomas 
John Elliott as Colonel Thomas
Harry Allen as Sergeant McCarey
Chief Standing Bear as Chief Standing Bear
Iron Eyes Cody as Little Eagle 
Ann Ross as Indian Girl

References

External links
 

1932 films
1930s English-language films
American Western (genre) films
1932 Western (genre) films
Monogram Pictures films
Films directed by Harry L. Fraser
American black-and-white films
1930s American films